Biddya is a Palestinian city in the Salfit Governorate, located 32 kilometers southwest of Nablus and half that distance from Salfit in the northern West Bank. According to the Palestinian Central Bureau of Statistics (PCBS), Biddya had a population of 8,064 in 2007. The town is governed by a municipal council of eleven members who each represent the prominent families of Biddya and select a mayor.

Biddya is situated on the western ridge of the central mountain range that runs north-south in the West Bank. The historical Nablus-Jerusalem road is nearby. A maqam (shrine) for a local holy man, Sheikh Hamdan is located in the town.

Location
It is bordered by Qarawat Bani Hassan and Sarta to the east, Kafr ad Dik to the south, Sanniriya, Rafat, Az Zawiya and Mas-ha to the west, and Kafr Thulth to the north. It has an elevation of about 359 meters above sea level.

History
Potsherds from the Iron Age II, Byzantine/Umayyad and Crusader/Ayyubid periods have been found here.

The area was examined in 1873 by the PEF's Survey of Western Palestine (SWP), who gave the following description: Rock-cut tombs exist here, principally rude caves. The rock is quarried in many places. South of the village is a birkeh (pool) about 30 feet by 20 feet, with a flight of 12 steps, leading down about 10 feet.	It is made of rudely squared stones, about 1 foot to 1 1/2 feet in length, which are covered again with a well-made rubble almost resembling a tesselated pavement, and this again is covered with a soft
white cement, containing large pieces of pottery and small stones. There is on each side of the pool (north and south) a semicircular stone buttress, 2 feet diameter, on a base about 4 feet;	this perhaps indicates that the birkeh was roofed in. South-west of Bidieh is an ancient ruined watch-tower.

Ottoman era
In 1596, Biddya (also known as Beddia, Bedia, Bidya, Bedya, and Bidieh) appeared in Ottoman tax registers as being in the nahiya of Jabal Qubal in the liwa of Nablus. It had a population of 8 households and 1 bachelor, all Muslim. The villagers paid a fixed tax-rate of 33,3 % on agricultural products, including wheat, barley, summer crops, olive trees, goats and beehives, in addition to occasional revenues; a total of 2,700 akçe. All of the revenue went to a Waqf.

In 1838, Edward Robinson noted it as a village, Bidia, in the Jurat Merda district, south of Nablus.

French explorer Victor Guérin passed by Beddia in 1870, and described it as a "mountain village", apparently of "some importance". In the 1882 "Survey of Western Palestine", Bidieh was described as "a village of moderate size, the houses principally of stone. It is surrounded with beautiful groves of very fine old olives.	It is evidently an ancient site. The water supply is from rock-cut cisterns."

British Mandate era
In the 1922 census of Palestine, conducted by the British Mandate authorities, Biddya (called: Bedia) had a population of 792, all Muslims, while in the 1931 census Biddya (including Salita) had 245 occupied houses and a population of 1,026, still all Muslim.

In the 1945 statistics the population was 1,360, all Muslims, while the total land area was 13,466 dunams, according to an official land and population survey. Of this, 5,088 were allocated for plantations and irrigable land, 2,319 for cereals, while 47 dunams were classified as built-up areas.

Jordanian era
In the wake of the 1948 Arab–Israeli War, and after the 1949 Armistice Agreements, Biddya came under Jordanian rule.

In 1961, the population of Biddya was 2,212.

Post-1967
Since the Six-Day War in 1967, Biddya has been under Israeli occupation.

After the 1995 accords, 15.2% of village land was classified as Area B, the remaining 84.8% as Area C. The Israeli plans for the Israeli West Bank barrier will isolate and confiscate 1,943 dunums of the southern part of village land from Biddya.

By mid-2012, according to Palestinian General Election Commission, Biddya's (بديا) population was 8,951 (not including expatriates).

Economy
Biddya depends primarily on olive groves for olive oil and Nabulsi soap production — the town's main industries. The town mostly receives food products from subsistence farming or local grocery markets.

Before the beginning of the Second Intifada in the fall of 2000, many residents worked in neighboring towns and cities, especially in Nablus and Ramallah, as well as for Israeli employers. The main road traversing the village, Road #505 (previously part of the Trans-Samaria Highway), was lined with many stores which served thousands of Israeli shoppers who would frequent the town each week, including residents of the Israeli settlements passing through, as well as Israelis living in the Tel Aviv area who were looking for products at low prices. Unemployment was about 20%; however, since the Intifada that figure has risen to 78-90%. Besides farming, some inhabitants live off their savings and others receive aid from relatives abroad.

Public institutions
Biddya has five schools — two for each gender and a private school. Most high school graduates who attend college enroll in an-Najah National University in Nablus or Bir Zeit University in Bir Zeit. There are four mosques and three health clinics in the town.

See also
Killing of Aisha al-Rabi

References

Bibliography

External links
صورة لخارطة مدن فلسطين قبل النكبة + صور لبلدة بديا (www.PALDF.net) شبكة فلسطين للحوار
 Welcome To Biddya
 Biddya, Welcome to Palestine
Survey of Western Palestine, Map 14:  IAA, Wikimedia commons
 Biddya Town (Fact Sheet), Applied Research Institute–Jerusalem (ARIJ)
Biddya Town Profile, ARIJ
Biddya - aerial photo, ARIJ
Development Priorities and Needs in Biddya, ARIJ

Towns in Salfit Governorate
Salfit Governorate
Municipalities of West Bank
Municipalities of the State of Palestine